Thiruvaheendrapuram is one of the revenue villages in Cuddalore district of Indian state, Tamil Nadu.

Devanathaswamy temple is one of the 108 Divya Desams. The presiding deity is Lord Devanatha Perumal and Thayar (Goddess) is Hemambujavalli.  This temple is considered to be a viable alternative to Tirupathi for those who can't make it and can make their offerings here, as Lord Devanathaswamy is believed to be the brother of Lord Venkateshwara. Many vaishnavas' family deity is Lord Devanathaswamy. The tonsuring and ear-boring ceremonies for kids in the families stage at the courtyard of Goddess Thayaar ammal. There is also a hill temple dedicated to Lord Hayagriva.  Many people reach here to perform Aksharabhyasam (the ceremony conducted for commencing education of a child).

The great Sri Vaishnava Guru Swami Vedanta Desika reached here as a human incarnation of the Lord's Ghanta (bell) who would attain fulfilment in his penance carried out on the Hill. When he was about 20 years old and had mastered all Sastras, he came to this place, worshipped Sri Hayagriva at the hill, prayed Garuda who appeared before him and initiated him in Hayagriva Upasana which helped Desika attain religious knowledge to its greatest depths. Swami Desikan spent nearly 40 years of his illustrious life in this Divya Desam. To this day, the house in which he lived (Desikan Thirumaaligai) can be visited when one comes to Thiruvahindrapuram.

External links 
 Official website of Cuddalore District
 Official website of Tamil Nadu
 Government of Tamil Nadu

References 

Cities and villages in Cuddalore taluk
Villages in Cuddalore district